Fredrik Natanael Beskow (9March 18658October 1953) was a Swedish theologian and school headmaster. He was also active as a preacher, writer, artist, pacifist and social activist. Beskow published a number of collections of sermons. He also made substantial contributions as a hymn writer.

Biography 
Beskow was born in Hallingeberg, Sweden (now Västervik Municipality, Småland, Sweden). The son of a priest, Beskow graduated from secondary school in 1883 and got a degree in theological philosophy at Uppsala University in 1884.

From 1888-92, he studied at the Royal Swedish Academy of Arts in Stockholm. He married the children's book author Elsa Beskow in 1897 while she was teaching at Djursholms samskola where he served as head master. Beskow was the headmaster of the newly established co-educational school in Djursholm from 1897 to 1909. They had six sons together.

During this time he worked as an artist, and earned a degree in practical theology in 1895. In 1896 he accepted an invitation from the previous year to become a preacher in Djursholm, which was being built at the time. Beskow never wholeheartedly agreed with the Swedish church's profession of faith, and was never ordained as a minister.

In 1912, with Ebba Pauli, he founded Birkagården, the first of Sweden's so-called "settlements" (hemgård); Beskow was director of Birkagården from 1912-46. He was headmaster of the boarding school (folkhögskola) at Birkagården from 1916-30, as well as honorary doctorate of theology at Lund University in 1918, and president of the Swedish Association for Christian Social Life (Förbundet för kristet samhällsliv), which he established, from 1918-43.

Beskow was a radical pacifist. He was also involved with the campaign for women's suffrage in Sweden (which was granted in 1919), and with the labor unions. Beskow was often engaged in leading negotiations, and became a prominent negotiator.

Works—a selection 
 Predikningar, 1901		
 Till de unga, 1904, 5th edition 1920
 För det dagliga livet, 1904-1906 
 Det kristna livet, 1908 
 Ett är nödvändigt, 1913 
 Enhet i mångfald, 1916 					
 Predikningar och föredrag i Birkagården 17-18, 1918 
 Fader vår, 1919 
 Predikningar 1919-1920, 1920
 På salighetens berg, 1921 
 Ett martyrfolk i det tjugonde århundradet (about the Armenian genocide), 1921
 Jesu liknelser, 1922 					
 Evigheten och ögonblicket, 1924 			
 Kristus och människan, 1926 
 I Palestina och Syrien, 1926 				
 Sanningens väg, 1929 
 Inför Människosonen, 1930 
 Arbetarrörelsens bildningsideal, 1930 			
 Guds rike, 1931 
 Evigt liv, 1932 
 Armeniska flyktingar av idag, 1936 
 Nutidsmänniskan och religionen, 1935 
 I passionstiden, 1937 
 Den kristna människan i världskrisen, 1937 
 Vägen, 1939
 Är kristendomen räddningen?, 1939
 Han som kommer, 1940 
 Ljuset lyser i mörkret, 1942 				
 Den heliga striden, 1943 
 Kristet samhällsliv - idé och handlingsprogram, 1943
 »... så ock på jorden», 1944
 Psalmer och andra dikter, 1944
 Kunskapsbildning och själsbildning, 1947
 Gudomligt och mänskligt, 1950
 Tillkomme ditt rike, 1952
 En dag har börjat, 1954

References 

1865 births
1953 deaths
People from Västervik Municipality
Swedish-language writers
Swedish Christian pacifists
Lutheran pacifists